Wigan Grammar School was founded in 1597; and closed in 1972 as part of the  comprehensive education movement.

Notable former pupils
 Ivor Abrahams, sculptor
 Stanley Alstead CBE, Regius Professor of Materia Medica and Therapeutics from 1948-70 at the University of Glasgow
 Walter Anderson CBE, General Secretary from 1957-73 of NALGO 
 Sir James Anderton CBE, former Chief Constable from 1976-91 of Greater Manchester Police (GMP)
 Colin Bean, actor in Dad's Army
 Eric Bolton CB, Chairman from 1997-2000 of the BookTrust, Professor of Teacher Education from 1991-96 at the UCL Institute of Education
 Dr Gordon Brown OBE, Chief Engineer from 1958-62 of Windscale AGR, President from 1975-77 of the British Nuclear Energy Society (became the Nuclear Institute in 2009)
 Sir Ernest Bullock CVO, Director from 1953-60 of the Royal College of Music (RCM), President from 1951-52 of the Royal College of Organists (RCO)
 Prof Kenneth Bullock, Professor of Pharmacy from 1955-70 at the University of Manchester
 Prof Gilbert Causey, Sir William Collins Professor of Anatomy from 1952-70 at the Royal College of Surgeons of England
 Prof Noel Coulson, Professor of Oriental Laws from 1967-86 at the School of Oriental and African Studies
 David Gee, Director from 1990-91 of Friends of the Earth, later at the European Environment Agency in Copenhagen
 Sir William Gorman, Liberal MP from 1923-24 for Gorton
 Sir Walter Greaves-Lord, Conservative MP from 1922-35 for Norwood
 Thomas Halliwell, former Principal of Trinity University College (now part of University of Wales Trinity Saint David since 2010)
 John Heaton, Chief Executive from 1997-2004 of the Horserace Totalisator Board (The Tote) 
 Brian Hill CBE, Chief Executive from 1977-90 of Lancashire County Council
 Arthur John Hope, architect
 Prof Paul Geoffrey Ince, Professor of Neuropathology at the Sheffield Institute for Translational Neuroscience University of Sheffield, President from 2016-2018 British Neuropathological Society, President from 2017-2020 European Confederation of Neuropathological Societies
 Stanley Jones, President from 1981-96 of the Printmakers Council, Director from 1959-2012 of Curwen Studio
 Sir Ian McKellen CBE, actor (for one year until he was twelve)
 Ian Macleod, surgeon
 Prof Stanley Mason, Principal and Vice-Chancellor from 1993-97 of Glasgow Caledonian University (former Glasgow Polytechnic)
 Sir Roy Meadow, Professor of Paediatrics and Child Health from 1980-98 at the University of Leeds, Chairman from 1983-84 of the Association for Child Psychology and Psychiatry, and from 1994-96 of the BPA (now the RCPCH since 1996)
 William Ormandy, former President of the Institute of Automobile Engineers
 Prof Norman Pye, Professor of Geography from 1954-79 at the University of Leicester
 Bryan Rigby, Chairman from 1998-2009 of the Anglo-German Foundation
 A. G. Rigg, medievalist
 William Roby
 Bryan Talbot, writer and artist, married to Mary M. Talbot, created The Adventures of Luther Arkwright
 William Thomson, Editor from 1944-73 of The Practitioner, Medical Correspondent from 1956-71 of The Times, and from 1971-83 of the Daily Telegraph
 Richard Warburton OBE, Director General from 1979-90 of RoSPA 
Professor David Turnock MA PhD Cantab - Professor of Geography Leicester University
 Charles Wilcocks CMG, President from 1963-65 of the Royal Society of Tropical Medicine and Hygiene
Gerald Wilkinson, illustrator, art historian, naturalist, photographer, artist and book-designer 
 Russ Winstanley, began the Northern soul nightclub at Wigan Casino in September 1973, later a broadcaster on Radio Lancashire

References

External links
 History

1597 establishments in England
1972 disestablishments in England
Defunct grammar schools in England
Defunct schools in the Metropolitan Borough of Wigan
Educational institutions established in the 16th century
Educational institutions disestablished in 1972
Wigan